Dendrobium section Distichophyllae is a section of the genus Dendrobium.

Description
Plants in this section have short creeping rhizomes, rigid straight leaves, and one or more solitary flowers.

Distribution
Plants from this section are found from China, to Southeast Asia, Australia, and New Guinea.

Species
Dendrobium section Distichophyllae comprises the following species:

References

Orchid subgenera